Phi Boötis (φ Boötis) is a single, yellow-hued star in the northern constellation of Boötes. It is dimly visible to the naked eye with an apparent visual magnitude of +5.24. Based upon an annual parallax shift of 19.22 mas as seen from the Earth, it is located 170 light years from the Sun. At that distance, the visual magnitude is diminished by an extinction of 0.09 due to interstellar dust. It is moving closer to the Sun with a radial velocity of −10.6 km/s.

However, Alves (2000) has it listed as a member of the so-called "red clump", indicating that it is an aging giant star that is generating energy through helium fusion at its core. The 'Fe-2' suffix notation in its class means that it displays a significant underabundance of iron in its spectrum. Around three billion years old, Phi Boötis has an estimated 1.43 times the mass of the Sun and 5 times the Sun's radius. It is radiating 17 times the Sun's luminosity from its photosphere at an effective temperature of about 4,945 K.

References

References
 
 

G-type giants
Horizontal-branch stars
Boötes
Bootis, Phi
Durchmusterung objects
Bootis, 54
139641
076534
5823